Hancock County is a county located in the U.S. state of Ohio. As of the 2020 census, the population was 74,920. Its county seat and largest city is Findlay. The county was created in 1820 and later organized in 1828. It was named for John Hancock, the first signer of the Declaration of Independence.

Hancock County comprises the Findlay, OH Micropolitan Statistical Area.

History
Hancock County was established on January 21, 1828, by the Ohio General Assembly from the southern portions of Wood County. Originally containing only Findlay Township, the county would add Amanda and Welfare (now Delaware) townships later in April of that year. Additional townships were laid out as follows: Jackson in 1829; Liberty and Marion in December 1830; Big Lick, Blanchard and Van Buren in 1831; Washington, Union, and Eagle in 1832; Cass and Portage in 1833; Pleasant in 1835; Orange in 1836; Madison in 1840, and finally Allen in 1850. Originally nearly 24 miles square, Hancock County would lose some of its southeast portion in 1845 to the new Wyandot County.

Geography

Adjacent counties
 Wood County (north)
 Seneca County (northeast)
 Wyandot County (southeast)
 Hardin County (south)
 Allen County (southwest)
 Putnam County (west)
 Henry County (northwest)

Demographics

2000 census
As of the census of 2000, there were 71,295 people, 27,898 households, and 19,138 families living in the county. The population density was 134 people per square mile (52/km2). There were 29,785 housing units at an average density of 56 per square mile (22/km2). The racial makeup of the county was 95.14% White, 1.11% Black or African American, 0.18% Native American, 1.22% Asian, 0.02% Pacific Islander, 1.22% from other races, and 1.12% from two or more races. 3.07% of the population were Hispanic or Latino of any race.

There were 27,898 households, out of which 32.60% had children under the age of 18 living with them, 56.40% were married couples living together, 8.70% had a female householder with no husband present, and 31.40% were non-families. 26.00% of all households were made up of individuals, and 9.80% had someone living alone who was 65 years of age or older. The average household size was 2.49 and the average family size was 3.01.

In the county, the population was spread out, with 25.70% under the age of 18, 9.70% from 18 to 24, 28.70% from 25 to 44, 22.60% from 45 to 64, and 13.20% who were 65 years of age or older. The median age was 36 years. For every 100 females there were 94.30 males. For every 100 females age 18 and over, there were 91.20 males.

The median income for a household in the county was $43,856, and the median income for a family was $51,490. Males had a median income of $37,139 versus $24,374 for females. The per capita income for the county was $20,991. About 5.20% of families and 7.50% of the population were below the poverty line, including 8.80% of those under age 18 and 6.10% of those age 65 or over.

2010 census
As of the 2010 United States Census, there were 74,782 people, 30,197 households, and 19,884 families living in the county. The racial makeup of the county was 93.4% white, 1.7% Asian, 1.5% black or African American, 0.2% American Indian, 1.4% from other races, and 1.8% from two or more races. Those of Hispanic or Latino origin made up 4.5% of the population. In terms of ancestry, 43.1% were German, 11.0% were Irish, 10.3% were English, and 6.6% were American.

Of the 30,197 households, 30.7% had children under the age of 18 living with them, 51.3% were married couples living together, 10.0% had a female householder with no husband present, 34.2% were non-families, and 27.9% of all households were made up of individuals. The average household size was 2.42 and the average family size was 2.94. The median age was 38.5 years.

The median income for a household in the county was $49,070 and the median income for a family was $59,600. Males had a median income of $42,479 versus $31,631 for females. The per capita income for the county was $25,158. About 8.5% of families and 11.4% of the population were below the poverty line, including 15.2% of those under age 18 and 5.7% of those age 65 or over.

Communities

Cities
 Findlay (county seat)
 Fostoria

Villages

 Arcadia
 Arlington
 Benton Ridge
 Bluffton
 Jenera
 McComb
 Mount Blanchard
 Mount Cory
 Rawson
 Van Buren
 Vanlue

Townships

 Allen
 Amanda
 Biglick
 Blanchard
 Cass
 Delaware
 Eagle
 Jackson
 Liberty
 Madison
 Marion
 Orange
 Pleasant
 Portage
 Union
 Van Buren
 Washington

Unincorporated communities

 Cannonsburg
 Cordelia
 Deweyville
 Houcktown
 Mortimer
 New Stark
 Portage Center
 Shawtown
 West Independence
 Williamstown

Ghost town
Moffit

Government

Politics
Although in the period up to World War I Hancock County's German heritage caused it to lean Democratic, since that war – when German Americans were driven from the Democratic Party by Woodrow Wilson’s postwar settlement policies and James M. Cox’s refusal to accept German language instruction – the county has been powerfully Republican. Since 1920 no Democratic presidential candidate has obtained an absolute majority of Hancock County's vote – although Franklin D. Roosevelt did win narrow pluralities in his 1932 and 1936 landslides – and it was one of just five Ohio counties that voted for Barry Goldwater over Lyndon B. Johnson in 1964. Although Goldwater won by just sixty-three votes, no Democratic presidential nominee since has cracked three-eighths of the county's vote.

|}

See also
 National Register of Historic Places listings in Hancock County, Ohio

References

External links

 Hancock County Government's website

 
1828 establishments in Ohio
Populated places established in 1828